Flentje is a surname. Notable people with the surname include:

 Annesa Flentje, American clinical psychologist
 H. Edward Flentje (born 1942), American educator

See also
 Ernst Flentje House, Cambridge, Massachusetts